Benjamin Hansen may refer to:
 Benjamin Hansen (footballer)
 Benjamin Hansen (economist)

See also
 Ben W. Hanson, member of the North Dakota House of Representatives